Victims of Death is the first compilation album by the American death metal band Possessed.

Track listing

Possessed (band) albums
1992 compilation albums
Combat Records albums